Aguatón is a municipality, located in the province of Teruel, Aragon, Spain. According to the 2018 census (INE), the municipality had a population of 18 inhabitants.

References 

Municipalities in the Province of Teruel